The 2011 Senior Bowl was an all-star college football exhibition game featuring players from the 2010 college football season, and prospects for the 2011 Draft of the professional National Football League (NFL). The 62nd edition of the Senior Bowl was won by the South team, 24–10.

The game was played on January 29, 2011, at 3 pm CST (4 p.m. Eastern time) at Ladd–Peebles Stadium in Mobile, Alabama, between "North" and "South" teams. The coaching staff of the Cincinnati Bengals, led by head coach Marvin Lewis, coached the North team. The coaching staff of the Buffalo Bills, led by head coach Chan Gailey, coached the South team.

Coverage of the event was in high-definition on the NFL Network. Clothing company Under Armour sponsored the game for the fifth consecutive year and provided apparel for the game.

For the South team, quarterback Christian Ponder, formerly with Florida State, threw 132 yards and two touchdowns and was named the Most Valuable Player. Leonard Hankerson, former Miami Hurricanes wide receiver, had five catches for 100 yards and one touchdown. He was named the Under Armour Offensive Player of the Game.

Game summary

Scoring summary

Statistics

References

Senior Bowl
Senior Bowl
Senior Bowl
Senior Bowl